Placencia Assassins Football Club are a football team based in Placencia, Belize. They currently play in the Premier League of Belize. In 2011 they were crowned as Super League of Belize champions.

Their home stadium is Placencia Football Field.

In 2018, they formed a agreement with Altitude FC with their franchise leased was leased for a year, and Altitude's team name was changed to Altitude Assassins, in which they participated in the 2018–19 Premier League of Belize. At the end of the 2018-19 Premier League of Belize Tournament, after completing a year as Altitude Assassins, the lease was terminated and Altitude regained their franchise, and returned to the Premier League of Belize.

Achievements

Super League of Belize: 1
2011

Premier League of Belize: 1
2012

Current squad

References

External links
Placencia Assassins

Football clubs in Belize